The Apocrypha controversy of the 1820s was a debate around the British and Foreign Bible Society and the issue of the inclusion of the Apocrypha in Bibles it printed for Christian missionary work.

History
The Society did include the Apocrypha in Bibles for use in continental Europe, where it was normal for Protestant as well as Catholic readers to have the texts of the Apocrypha. Prior to 1629, all English-language Bibles included the Old Testament, the Apocrypha, and the New Testament; examples include the "Matthew's Bible (1537), the Great Bible (1539), the Geneva Bible (1560), the Bishop's Bible (1568), and the King James Bible (1611)". Robert Haldane criticised this policy.

The British and Foreign Bible Society had in fact dropped the Apocrypha from its bibles published in English in 1804. This decision broke with the tradition of Myles Coverdale, of consolidating the Apocrypha between the two Testaments. They reasoned that by not printing the secondary material of Apocrypha within the Bible, the scriptures would prove to be less costly to produce.

Haldane and William Thorpe began a general campaign in 1821, against all Bibles with the Apocrypha and their printing with funds raised from British sources. The Society was divided over the issue, but the majority view favoured the existing policy of case-by-case inclusion. In Spring 1826 an attempt to reach a compromise with Haldane's view broke down. As a result, the major Scottish branches in Edinburgh and Glasgow left the Society. Most Scottish branches followed, and a few in England.

Nevertheless, to this date, scripture readings from the Apocrypha are included in the lectionaries of the Lutheran Churches and the Anglican Churches. In the present-day, "English Bibles with the Apocrypha are becoming more popular again", usually being printed as intertestamental books. The Revised Common Lectionary, in use by most mainline Protestants including Methodists and Moravians, lists readings from the Apocrypha in the liturgical calendar, although alternate Old Testament scripture lessons are provided.

References

Further reading
A Biographical Dictionary of Eminent Scotsmen: Supplement Abercrombie-Wood, By Robert Chambers, Thomas Thomson, 1855, Blackie, pp. 276-78, an account from a Protestant perspective.

1820s in the United Kingdom
Deuterocanonical books
History of religion in Scotland